The Energy & Environmental Research Center (EERC) is a research, development, demonstration, and commercialization facility for energy and environment technologies development. The center is a nonprofit division of the University of North Dakota, located in Grand Forks, North Dakota, United States.

History
The center was founded in 1951 as the Robertson Lignite Research Laboratory, a federal facility under the United States Bureau of Mines, named after Charles R. Robertson.  It became a federal energy technology center under the United States Department of Energy in 1977 and was defederalized in 1983. The center employs approximately 270 employees.

The EERC has a current contract portfolio of over $208.4 million and the EERC's estimated regional economic impact is $78.1 million. Since 1987, the EERC has had more than 1,300 clients in 50 states and 53 countries worldwide.

Research
The EERC conducts research, development, demonstration, and commercialization activities involving zero-emissions coal conversion; CO2 capture and sequestration; energy and water sustainability; hydrogen and fuel cells; advanced air emission control technologies, emphasizing SOx, NOx, air toxics, fine particulate, CO2, and mercury control; renewable energy; wind energy; water management; flood prevention; global climate change; waste utilization; energy efficiency; and contaminant cleanup.

Location and facilities

Notes

External links
 
EERC Solutions Blog

University of North Dakota
Buildings and structures in Grand Forks, North Dakota
Research institutes in North Dakota
Energy research institutes